The Central African Football Federations' Union, officially abbreviated as UNIFFAC, is a regional governing body for association football teams in Central Africa. Current president Iya Mohammed was re-elected in 2008.

Member associations

Competitions

UNIFFAC runs several competitions which cover men's, women's, youth.

Current title holders

Defunct competitions

A women's tournament and the re-introduction of the Clubs Cup was announced in January 2011.

See also

Confederation of African Football (CAF)
Council for East and Central Africa Football Associations (CECAFA)
Council of Southern Africa Football Associations (COSAFA)
Union of North African Football Federations (UNAF)
West African Football Union (WAFU)

References

External links 
 CAFonline.com

Central African Football Federations' Union